An email digest is an email that is automatically generated by an electronic mailing list and which combines all exchanged emails during a time period (e.g. day, week, month, etc.) or when a volume limit is reached (e.g. every 10 or 100 messages) into one single message.

Email digests are currently available as an opt-in feature in electronic mailing list systems such as GNU Mailman or LISTSERV. It is called an abridged summary in Google Groups. Other systems than mailing lists implement such a feature. YouTube compiles all the communications to users within a time period into a single email.

Technically, the MIME Multipart subtype Multipart/digest as defined in RFC 2046, Section 5.1.5, is a simple way to separate messages and send collections of messages within one single message.

See also
 LISTSERV email list management software
 Electronic mailing list
 GNU Mailman
 Google Groups

References

Email
Electronic mailing lists